Saïd Senhaji (1968) is a chaabi singer from  Casablanca, Morocco. His roots go back to Taounate, Morocco. He is sometimes referred to as Sultan al-Ughnia ash-Sha'abia (سلطان الاغنية الشعبية Sultan of the Chaabi Ballad).

Songs 

 Pirouche ould El Abdia, Senhaji Said, Titou, Nachat el R'ma, Samia and Fouzia lehrizia, Non Stop Jarra Vol. 2, Fassifone, 2005
 Senhaji Said, Senhaji Said, Fassifone, 2005
 Senhaji Said, Daoudi, Saïd Lahna, Ahmed Al Boutoula, Najat Tazi and Doukkala, Jarra non stop Chayyeb, Fassifone, 2002

References 

21st-century Moroccan male singers
People from Casablanca
1968 births
Living people